Lincoln Norman William Hurring (15 September 1931 – 21 April 1993) was a swimmer from New Zealand. He won two silver medals at the 1954 British Empire Games, in the 110 yards backstroke and in the 330 yards medley relay. He also competed in the 100 m backstroke at the 1952 and 1956 Olympics. Hurring became a swimming coach, and gave TV commentaries on several Olympics.

Hurring was born in Dunedin in 1931. In 1957 he married fellow swimmer Jean Stewart, who won an Olympic bronze medal in the 100 metres backstroke in 1952. Their son, Gary Hurring, also became an Olympic swimmer, and their daughter Kim, a television reporter.

In the 1950s, Hurring was a student at the University of Iowa on an athletic scholarship, while competing for the university's Iowa Hawkeyes swimming and diving team.  While at Iowa he won several NCAA, Big Ten Conference and U.S. national open backstroke titles. In 2001 he was inducted into the University of Iowa Hall of Fame.

From 1954 Hurring and Jean Stewart coached swimming at Three Kings School in Auckland, and in 1975 they moved to the Takapuna Municipal Pool.

In 1993, aged 61, Hurring collapsed and died on Milford Beach, Auckland from a heart attack.

See also
 List of Commonwealth Games medallists in swimming (men)

References

1931 births
1993 deaths
New Zealand male backstroke swimmers
Olympic swimmers of New Zealand
Commonwealth Games silver medallists for New Zealand
Swimmers at the 1952 Summer Olympics
Swimmers at the 1956 Summer Olympics
Swimmers at the 1954 British Empire and Commonwealth Games
Iowa Hawkeyes men's swimmers
Commonwealth Games medallists in swimming
Swimmers from Dunedin
20th-century New Zealand people
Medallists at the 1954 British Empire and Commonwealth Games